Inflationary psychology is a sociological and economic phenomenon that occurs during times of Inflation.

References

Financial markets
Behavioral finance